Creuddyn may refer to:
 The Creuddyn Peninsula, in Conwy county borough
 Creuddyn, Ceredigion, a historic commote of Ceredigion
 Creuddyn, Rhos, a historic commote of Cantref Rhos 
 Llanfihangel y Creuddyn, a village and parish in Ceredigion
 Ysgol y Creuddyn, a secondary school in Penrhyn Bay